This is a list of Hindi films that were released in 2017.

Box office collection
The highest-grossing Bollywood films released in 2017, by worldwide box office gross revenue, are as follows.

Secret Superstar has grossed  worldwide, and is the 4th highest-grossing Indian film of all time.
Tiger Zinda Hai has grossed  worldwide, and is the 11th highest-grossing Indian film of all time.

January–March

April–June

July–September

October–December

See also
 List of Bollywood films of 2018
 List of Bollywood films of 2016

Notes

References

2018
Bollywood
Bollywood